The men's pentathlon was a track and field athletics event held as part of the Athletics at the 1920 Summer Olympics programme.  It was the second time the event was held.

Results

Long jump

Javelin throw

200 metres

Discus throw

1500 metres

References

Sources
 
 

Men's all-around pentathlon
1920